Hamal 18 (also known as Hamal_18) is a 2004 American film starring Michael J. Minor, Yvette Ford, Wendy Cobb, Chad England, Joel Spence, Elina Madison and directed by John G. Thomas.

Plot
A detective assumes the persona of his young daughter and hunts the internet for the man who killed her.

References

External links

Official site

2004 films
American mystery films
2000s English-language films
2000s American films